Jan Tebrügge (born 14 December 1982 in Münster) is a German rower.

References 
 

1982 births
Living people
German male rowers
Sportspeople from Münster
World Rowing Championships medalists for Germany